Máximo Lucas (born January 28, 1979) is a Uruguayan footballer currently playing for Beijing Baxy in China. He played in clubs of Uruguay, Argentina, Chile, Mexico, Honduras and Colombia.

Titles
 Marathon 2009 (Torneo Apertura Liga Nacional de Honduras Championship)

References
 Profile at BDFA 
 Profile at Tenfield Digital 

1979 births
Living people
Uruguayan footballers
Uruguayan expatriate footballers
Uruguay international footballers
Liverpool F.C. (Montevideo) players
Danubio F.C. players
C.D. Marathón players
Olimpo footballers
Club Atlético River Plate footballers
Tecos F.C. footballers
Deportivo Cali footballers
Universidad de Chile footballers
Uruguayan Primera División players
Chilean Primera División players
Argentine Primera División players
Liga MX players
Liga Nacional de Fútbol Profesional de Honduras players
Categoría Primera A players
Beijing Sport University F.C. players
China League One players
Expatriate footballers in Chile
Expatriate footballers in China
Expatriate footballers in Argentina
Expatriate footballers in Colombia
Expatriate footballers in Honduras
Expatriate footballers in Mexico
Association football defenders